In arithmetic combinatorics, the corners theorem states that for every , for large enough , any set of at least  points in the  grid  contains a corner, i.e., a triple of points of the form  with . It was first proved by Miklós Ajtai and Endre Szemerédi in 1974 using Szemerédi's theorem. In 2003, József Solymosi gave a short proof using the triangle removal lemma.

Statement
For every , there exists a positive integer  such that for any , any subset  with size at least  contains a corner.

Proof overview
What follows is a sketch of Solymosi's argument.

Suppose  is corner-free.

Quantitative bounds
The best known bounds are

The lower bound is due to Green, building on the work of Linial and Shraibman. The upper bound is due to Shkredov.

Multidimensional extension
The natural extension of the corners theorem to this setting can be shown using the hypergraph removal lemma, in the spirit of Solymosi's proof. The hypergraph removal lemma was shown independently by Gowers and Nagle, Rödl, Schacht and Skokan.

Multidimensional Szemerédi's Theorem
The multidimensional Szemerédi theorem states that for any fixed finite subset , and for every , there exists a positive integer  such that for any , any subset  with size at least  contains a subset of the form . This theorem follows from the multidimensional corners theorem by a simple projection argument. In particular, Roth's theorem follows directly from the ordinary corners theorem.

References

External links
Proof of the corners theorem on polymath.

1974 introductions
1974 in mathematics

Ramsey theory
Additive combinatorics
Theorems in combinatorics